The Zoot Cat  is a 1944 American Technicolor one-reel animated short and is the 13th Tom and Jerry short. It was released to theatres on February 26, 1944 by Metro-Goldwyn-Mayer. The cartoon features much 1940s slang, a parody of the popular (but controversial) zoot suit, and some features of 1930s popular culture.

Plot 
A Valentine note to Toots from Tom, with a pink ribbon tied to Jerry, is inside a gift box. Meanwhile, Tom gets ready for a date, his whiskers in curlers.

Tom knocks on the door, rings the doorbell and shouts before dropping the box and hiding behind a pillar on the porch. Toots opens the door and is pleasantly surprised at the gift. Tom then attempts to impress Toots by playing a ukulele, singing, doing tricks with a yo-yo and dancing. Finally, Tom presents her with a bouquet of flowers, but a loose floorboard smacks him in the face and knocks him flat.

Toots responds with a scathing disparagement of Tom in jive talk, while Jerry nods in agreement to her words. After she throws the gift back at Tom (which includes Jerry), Jerry grabs an ear of corn and plants it in the box, signifying that Tom's efforts were "corny" (slang for outdated). Tom then hears a radio commercial for a zoot suit, which gives Tom an idea: to make his own zoot suit and dazzle his girlfriend.

On his knocking on the door again, Toots is now electrified and Jerry shocked to see Tom in the impressive outfit, calling him "Jackson". Tom lights a cigar as Toots compliments his new, hip look before inviting him inside. They start to jive dance and Jerry politely cuts in, dancing a few steps with Toots before Tom realizes what's going on. Tom chases Jerry, who escapes by jumping into an ashtray and rubbing a burning cigarette butt on Tom’s nose.

Jerry then peels a banana and throws the skin onto the floor, which sends Tom crashing into a piano. But he recovers in majestic form and starts to play the piano, taking on the persona of a suave, romantic lover and trying to impress Toots by using a Charles Boyer-esque voice saying, "You set my soul on fire. It is not just a little spark; it is a flame, a big roaring flame," during which Jerry sticks matches between Tom's toes, and lights them in order to give him a hot foot. Tom unwittingly continues with a fire-related wooing until the flames engulf his feet. He pauses, sniffs the smoke-filled air, and remarks in a Groucho Marx voice "Say, something is burning around here!", then realizes his foot is on fire and leaps about, yelling hysterically. Tom then pursues Jerry, who opens up a floor vent door, causing the pursuing cat to fall in down to the basement.

Jerry resumes dancing with Toots. Tom returns, determined to flatten Jerry with a fireplace shovel. A chase ensues. Jerry hides behind a table leg and uses his foot to trip Tom. Jerry clips the hanger in Tom's jacket to a window-shade, then kicks Tom in the eyes. Tom angrily pursues the fleeing mouse, but the shade rolls back taking Tom with it.

By the window, Tom gets repeatedly dunked in a fishbowl. This causes the suit to shrink and squeeze the cat and eventually pop off his body. Jerry jumps into the shrunken suit, which is now a perfect fit for him. He then struts away, pleased with his new suit.

Voice cast 
 Jerry Mann as Tom Cat and the Radio Announcer (uncredited)
 Sara Berner as Jerry and the Girl Cat
 Additional Voices by Billy Bletcher and Dick Nelson

Availability 
VHS
Tom & Jerry's 50th Birthday Classics 2
Laserdisc
The Art of Tom & Jerry: Volume One, Side Two
DVD
Tom and Jerry's Greatest Chases, Vol. 1
Tom and Jerry Spotlight Collection Vol. 1, Disc One
Tom and Jerry Golden Collection Volume One, Disc One
Blu-ray
Tom and Jerry Golden Collection Volume One, Disc One
iTunes
Tom and Jerry Vol. 1
Streaming
Boomerang App

Censorship 
Because of the United Kingdom's ban of TV characters smoking, Tom smoking a cigar and a cigarette and Jerry putting the cigarette on Tom's nose is faded out.

References

External links 

1944 short films
1944 animated films
Tom and Jerry short films
Short films directed by Joseph Barbera
Short films directed by William Hanna
1940s American animated films
1940s animated short films
1944 romantic comedy films
1944 musical comedy films
American romantic comedy films
American musical comedy films
Films scored by Scott Bradley
Metro-Goldwyn-Mayer animated short films
1940s English-language films
Metro-Goldwyn-Mayer short films
1940s musical comedy films
Films produced by Fred Quimby
Metro-Goldwyn-Mayer cartoon studio short films
American animated short films
Animated films about cats
Animated films about mice
1950s American films